Dolores is a municipality in the Carazo department of Nicaragua.

Located between Diriamba to the west and Jinotepe to the east, Dolores has around 6,500 inhabitants.

Municipalities of the Carazo Department